Sir Basil Brodribb Hall, KCB, MC (2 January 1918 Finsbury Park – 2 May 2011) was a British civil servant.

Hall was educated at Merchant Taylors' School, Northwood. He became an articled clerk with Gibson & Weldon in 1935; and was admitted solicitor in  1942. During World War II he served with the 27th Lancers. When peace returned he joined the Civil Service's Treasury Solicitor’s Department; and rose to become Treasury Solicitor from 1975 until 1980. He was Chairman of the Civil Service Appeal Board from 1981 to 1984; and the UK Member of the European Commission of Human Rights from 1985 to 1993.

Notes

1918 births
2011 deaths
People from Finsbury Park
English solicitors
Civil servants from London
Treasury Solicitors
Knights Commander of the Order of the Bath
Recipients of the Military Cross
People educated at Merchant Taylors' School, Northwood
27th Lancers officers
Members of the European Commission of Human Rights
20th-century English lawyers
British Army personnel of World War II